Whale Adventure is a 1960 children's book by the Canadian-born American author Willard Price featuring his "Adventure" series characters, Hal and Roger Hunt.

The novel depicts Hal and Roger's journey on a whaling ship with anachronistic, nineteenth century features such as harpooning by hand, hard tack, the brig, and keel-hauling. Price borrows the setting and many key events from Herman Melville's Moby-Dick.

Plot

A scientist travels in the ship as a passenger. The captain of the ship does not agree to accommodate any more passengers, so the only way the boys may go on the journey is to join the crew.

Roger defends a captured sperm whale against a group of sharks and later a pack of killer whales. This novel also explain how clever killer whales are.

The captain of the ship is a ruthless man who tortures and punishes the crew. He is beaten by Hal in a hand-to-hand fight. When an old sailor, who is keelhauled as a punishment, is eaten by a shark, the crew takes the control of the ship, confining the captain and his henchman in the cage.

In the end of the story, their ship was destroyed by a sperm whale and they were saved by a modern whaler with a whale-spotting helicopter.

1960 American novels
Novels by Willard Price
Jonathan Cape books
1960 children's books
Fiction about whales
Children's novels about animals